Beedala Patlu is a 1972 Indian Telugu-language drama film, produced and directed by B. Vittalacharya. It stars Akkineni Nageswara Rao and Krishna Kumari, with music composed by K. V. Mahadevan. The film is based on the 1862 French novel Les Misérables, written by Victor Hugo.

Plot 
During the Pre-independence era, Kotaiah (Akkineni Nageswara Rao) steals a loaf of bread to feed his young niece and ailing mother. He is arrested and the court sentences him to two months in prison. His niece visits him in jail telling him of her mother's death, knowing that he tried to escape from jail but was caught and his imprisonment increases to five years, which goes on extending; totally, Kotaiah spends twelve years in prison. Shanta (Krishna Kumari) Kotaiah's niece is married to Ram Gopal (Satyanarayana) and they have a baby girl Padma. Ram Gopal, who is in bad company and a crook gets her to part with all her jewelry and disappears with it. Meanwhile, Kotaiah, on release from jail, has been told by the jail authorities including Inspector Javert (Gummadi) a tough and ruthless Police officer, to keep them informed about his whereabouts and to present himself regularly at the police station. When he returns to his locality, he is unable to find Shanta and the neighbors drive him away, calling him a dacoit. Kotaiah turns over a new leaf with the help of a Christian Bishop (V. Nagayya), who helps him realize himself and introduces himself as Dayanidhi, who becomes successful and becomes Mayor of his town. Once Kotaiah meets up with Shanta on her death bed and before dying, she hands over Padma's responsibility to Kotaiah. Meanwhile, Inspector Javert finds out about his new life and threatens to expose him all the time. Time goes on, and grown Padma (Chandrakala) falls in love with Arun Kumar (Chandra Mohan), a freedom fighter. In a fight between the revolutionaries and the police, Javert is imprisoned by them, but subsequently, Kotaiah saves Javert's life. Javert commits suicide unable to turn Kotaiah into the authorities out of his sense of gratitude. Simultaneously, Arun Kumar gets injured by British Police. Kotaiah comes to his rescue, When Arun Kumar recovers, Ram Gopal has also been identified by them. Finally, the movie ends with the marriage of Arun Kumar & Padma and Kotaiah breathes his last, happily.

Cast 
Akkineni Nageswara Rao as Kotaiah / Dayanidhi / K. V. Purushotham
Krishna Kumari as Shantha
V. Nagayya as Father
Gummadi as Inspector Javert
Rao Gopal Rao as Raobahadoor Raja Ram Mohan Rao
Satyanarayana as Ram Gopal
Allu Ramalingaiah as Suraiah
Chandra Mohan as Arun Kumar
Suryakantham as Kanthamma
Chandrakala as Padma
Vijaya Lalitha as Seetha

Soundtrack 

Music composed by K. V. Mahadevan.

See also
 Adaptations of Les Misérables

References

External links 
 

Films based on Les Misérables
Films scored by K. V. Mahadevan
Indian drama films